Miodrag Mitić (15 September 1959 – 7 February 2022) was a Yugoslav volleyball player. He competed in the men's tournament at the 1980 Summer Olympics. Mitić died on 7 February 2022, at the age of 62.

Mitić attended the Faculty of Medicine at the University of Belgrade and after graduation worked as a specialist in physiology. At the 2012 Summer Olympics, he served as team physician for the Serbian women's national team, and his son Mihajlo Mitić was part of the Serbian men's team squad.

References

External links

1959 births
2022 deaths
Yugoslav men's volleyball players
Olympic volleyball players of Yugoslavia
Volleyball players at the 1980 Summer Olympics